The 1979–80 Liga Bet season saw Maccabi Shefa-'Amr, Maccabi Or Akiva, Hapoel Rosh HaAyin and Maccabi Be'er Sheva win their regional divisions and promoted to Liga Alef.

At the bottom, Maccabi Tiberias, Beitar al-Amal Nazareth (from North A division), Maccabi Zikhron Ya'akov, Maccabi HaSharon Netanya (from North B division), Beitar Holon, Beitar Jaffa (from South A division), Hapoel Ofakim and Hapoel Kiryat Gat (from South B division) were all automatically relegated to Liga Gimel.

North Division A

North Division B

South Division A

South Division B

References
Liga Bet Maariv, 27.4.80, Historical Jewish Press 
Due to goal difference Tiberias relegated to Liga Gimel Maariv, 11.5.80, Historical Jewish Press 

Liga Bet seasons
Israel
4